Susanna Karolina Wallumrød (born 23 June 1979 in Kongsberg, Norway) is a Norwegian vocalist, known for her low key original songs. She is the sister of the drummer Fredrik Wallumrød and the pianist Christian Wallumrød, cousin of the pianist David Wallumrød, and is married to the music producer Helge Sten.

Career

Susanna and the Magical Orchestra is the moniker of singer Susanna and keyboard player Morten Qvenild. Her song "Believer" from their first album and their cover version of Joy Division's "Love Will Tear Us Apart" featured in two 3rd season episodes of the American medical drama Grey's Anatomy and on 3rd season of Skins, on episode 6.

The German rock band Fury in the Slaughterhouse uses Susanna's AC/DC-cover of "It's a Long Way to the Top If You Wanna Rock'n Roll" as intro and the Joy-Division-cover "Love Will Tear Us Apart" as Outro on their "Farewell & Goodbye Tour 2008".

Susanna Wallumrød has cooperated with baroque harpist Giovanna Pessi, who has previously made herself known with a variety of ECM recordings. Pessi's collaboration with pianist Christian Wallumrød brought her regularly to Oslo, where she met and became friends with Susanna, the pianist's sister. Susanna invited Pessi to play on her solo album Sonata Mix Dwarf Cosmos (2008), and four years later, the Norwegian vocalist's turn to take guest role.

On If Grief Could Wait she sings both her own songs and compositions by Henry Purcell, Leonard Cohen and Nick Drake. In the center of the album is Susannas clear voice and Pessis delicate harp. The ensemble also comprises Marco Ambrosini on nyckelharpa and Jan Achtman on viola da gamba.

A bright meeting between Tord Gustavsen's strong Norwegian Quartet and Susanna Wallumrød, brings one of our most distinctive vocalists to the premiere of a new musical project during the Oslo Jazz Festival 2012. The musical movements that Wallumrød sings, are previously done with singers of Trio Mediaeval and Tord Gustavsen Trio.

Led Zeppelin's John Paul Jones joined Susanna and Deathprod at Øya-festialen 2013.

Honors 
2012: Gammleng-prisen in the Open class
2013: Spellemannprisen in the Open class
2015: Radka Toneff Memorial Award
2016: Kongsberg Jazz Award
2014: Spellemannprisen in the Open class
2016: Spellemannprisen in the Open class

Discography 

Magical Orchestra
 2004: List of Lights and Buoys (Rune Grammofon)
 2006: Melody Mountain (Rune Grammofon)
 2009: 3 (Rune Grammofon)

Susanna 
 2007: Sonata Mix Dwarf Cosmos (Rune Grammofon)
 2008: Flower of Evil (Rune Grammofon)
 2012: Wild Dog (Rune Grammofon)
 2013: The Forester (SusannaSonata)
 2016: Triangle (SusannaSonata)
 2018: Go Dig My Grave (SusannaSonata)

Susanna Wallumrød
 2011: Jeg Vil Hjem Til Menneskene (Grappa Music), Susanna Wallumrød sings Gunvor Hofmo

With Jenny Hval
 2014: Meshes of Voice (SusannaSonata)

With the Brotherhood of Our Lady
 2019: Garden of Earthly Delights (SusannaSonata)

References

External links

Susanna and the Magical Orchestra Biography – AlwaysOnTheRun.net
Susanna Wallumrød performs Jailbreak on YouTube
Giovanna Pessi and Susanna Wallumrød – „If Grief Could Wait" on YouTube
SusannaSonata Music Label

Musicians from Kongsberg
Norwegian composers
Rune Grammofon artists
ECM Records artists
1979 births
Living people
21st-century Norwegian singers
21st-century Norwegian women singers